The Blind Workers' Union of Victoria (BWU) is a trade union in Australia. It is affiliated with the Australian Council of Trade Unions. The union represents vision-impaired workers.

References

External links
 BWU at the ACTU.

Trade unions in Victoria (Australia)